Dream Machine may refer to:

Technology
Dreamachine, a light effect
Buckeye Dream Machine, an American powered parachute design
Sony Dream Machine, a line of clock radios by Sony

Media
"The Dream Machine", an episode of Astro Boy
Computer Lib/Dream Machines, a 1974 two-in-one set book by Ted Nelson
Dream Machine (film), a 1990 direct-to-video thriller film
The Dream Machine (miniseries), a 1992, BBC documentary series, on the history of computing, released in the US as The Machine That Changed the World
Dreaming Machine (夢みる機械 Yume Miru Kikai), an unfinished anime film by Satoshi Kon
"Dream Machine" (Dexter's Laboratory), an episode of the animated television series Dexter's Laboratory
The Dream Machine (video game), an episodic video game started in 2010
Dream Machines, an American TV series
The Dream Machine: J.C.R. Licklider and the Revolution That Made Computing Personal, a 2001 biography of Internet pioneer J. C. R. Licklider

Other
Troy Graham (1949–2002), professional wrestler whose nickname is The Dream Machine
Dream Machine, a Calaway Park amusement park ride
Dream Machine, a ring name of Kazuo Sakurada
Dream Machine, a now defunct retail chain of fun centers filled with arcade games and more

Music
Dream Machine, a rock band led by Matthew and Doris Melton
Dream Machine (album), an album by Tokio Hotel
"Dream Machine", a song by Alphaville, released as a track on their CD set, Dreamscapes
"Dream Machine", a track from Scenes from the Second Storey by The God Machine
"Silver Dream Machine", a song by David Essex